Cable News Network Films (known as CNN Films) is a motion picture division of CNN under Warner Bros. Pictures, originally launched in 2012. Its first film, Girl Rising premiered in spring 2013 in the United States.

History
On October 8, 2012, CNN announced the creation of CNN Films. CNN says that it will acquire and commission original feature-length documentaries that will "examine an array of political, social, and economic subject matters." It also signed development deals with documentary directors Alex Gibney and Andrew Rossi. Since its creation, it already acquired the rights for Girl Rising, a 100-minute documentary narrated by Meryl Streep, Anne Hathaway, Kerry Washington, and Selena Gomez.

While the documentaries will initially air on CNN, the network reportedly plans to enter them in film festivals and distribute them to theaters as well.

At the 2013 Sundance Film Festival, CNN announced the acquisition of three documentaries. It acquired the rights to air Life Itself, a film adaptation of Roger Ebert's 2011 memoir, in television. The project will be directed by Steve James and executive produced by Martin Scorsese and Steven Zaillian. It is scheduled to air in 2014. The two other untitled projects are expected to air on CNN in 2013. One, from directors Michael Tucker and Petra Epperleini, centers on 9/11 and reconstructs the events at Ground Zero; the other, from director Andrew Rossi, focuses on the transformation of higher education, examining the costs and relevance of college.

CNN Films bought the television rights of Escape Fire: The Fight to Rescue American Healthcare which premiered on March 10, 2013, on CNN. The film was directed by Matthew Heineman and Susan Froemke. The film premiered on January 19, 2012, at the 2013 Sundance Film Festival and was theatrically released on October 5, 2012.

CNN Films acquired Penny Lane's Our Nixon, and CNN premiered the film in August 2013, while Cinedigm released it theatrically. The network has also then acquired the domestic television broadcast rights of the Sundance film selection Robert Stone's Pandora's Promise and aired it on CNN in November 2013 while it was theatrically released five months before.

On December 10, 2020, CNN Films teamed up with the BBC to produce a documentary about the development and manufacturing of vaccines for the COVID-19 pandemic. The documentary is produced by British virologist-turned-filmmaker Catherine Gale who also directs with American independent filmmaker and medical journalist Caleb Hellerman, and will air in 2021 on CNN in the United States under the tile Race for the Vaccine and BBC Two in the United Kingdom under the title Vaccine: The Inside Story.

Filmography

References

External links

CNN
Film distributors of the United States
Film production companies of the United States
American companies established in 2012
Mass media companies established in 2012